Thièvres is a commune in the Somme department in Hauts-de-France in northern France.

Geography
The village Thièvres is divided between two communes: one part in the Somme department and the other, larger part in the Pas-de-Calais department (Thièvres, Pas-de-Calais). The nineteenth-century church was built in the territory of the Pas-de-Calais.

Thièvres also stands at the confluence of the rivers Authie and Kilienne.

Population

See also
Communes of the Somme department

References

Communes of Somme (department)